Orellia is a genus of tephritid  or fruit flies in the family Tephritidae.

Species
Orellia falcata (Scopoli, 1763)
Orellia scorzonerae (Robineau-Desvoidy, 1830)
Orellia stictica (Gmelin, 1790)
Orellia tragopogonis Korneyev, 2003

References

Tephritinae
Tephritidae genera
Diptera of Asia
Diptera of Europe